Johannes Mötsch (born 8 July 1949 in Bonn) is a German archivist and historian.

Life 
Johannes Mötsch studied History and Latin Philology from 1970 to 1978 at the Universität Bonn and graduated in 1979. In 1978 he started, as trainee teacher, the preliminary office at the Landeshauptarchiv Koblenz and attended the Archivschule Marburg until 1980. Until 1993 he worked at the Landeshauptarchiv Koblenz and taught in 1989 at the Marburger Archivschule. In 1993 he went to the thuringian Hauptstaatsarchiv Weimar, where he worked until 1997. In the same year he overtook as archive director the management of the Thüringisches Staatsarchiv in Meiningen.

He is a member of the Historische Kommission für Thüringen.

Works (selection) 
 Balduin von Luxemburg. Erzbischof von Trier — Kurfürst des Reiches 1285–1354. Festschrift aus Anlaß des 700. Geburtsjahres, hrsg. von Franz-Josef Heyen und Johannes Mötsch (Quellen und Abhandlungen zur mittelrheinischen Kirchengeschichte 53), Mainz 1985
 Regesten des Archivs der Grafen von Sponheim 1065–1437, Teil 1-5, bearbeitet von Johannes Mötsch, Landesarchivverwaltung Rheinland - Pfalz, 1987–1991
 Geschichtlicher Atlas der Rheinlande, Beiheft V/4: Die Grafschaften Sponheim, von Johannes Mötsch, Köln: Rheinland-Verlag, 1992
 Die ältesten Lehnsbücher der Grafen von Henneberg, bearbeitet von Johannes Mötsch und Katharina Witter, Weimar: Böhlau, 1996 - 
  Fuldische Frauenklöster in Thüringen: Regesten zur Geschichte der Klöster Allendorf, Kapellendorf und Zella, Rhön, bearb. und eingel. von Johannes Mötsch, München u.a.: Urban und Fischer, 1999 - 
 Die Wallfahrt zu Grimmenthal: Urkunden, Rechnungen, Mirakelbuch, herausgegeben von Johannes Mötsch, Köln u.a.: Böhlau, 2004 - 
 Regesten des Archivs der Grafen von Henneberg-Römhild, Teilbände 1 und 2, herausgegeben von Johannes Mötsch, Köln u.a.: Böhlau, 2006 -

External links 
  Literature by and about Johannes Mötsch at the catalog of the German National Library.

1949 births
Living people
Writers from Bonn
German archivists
20th-century German historians
German male non-fiction writers